Ilegales (also called Los Ilegales, "The Illegals") is a Grammy-nominated Dominican merenhouse trio. It is one of the main exponents that helped to introduce and establish the merenhouse to the mainstrean and get an international audience. The band is well known by hits such as "La Morena", "Taki Taki", "Tu Recuerdo", "La Otra" and "Chucucha". They were one of the first merenhouse acts to perform at Viña del Mar International Song Festival in 1998 and 2003.

Ilegales is one of the best selling Dominican acts, receiving gold and platinum certifications across Latin America, and winning Latin Billboard Music awards, Soberano Awards, and receiving nominations to the Grammy Awards and Latin Grammy Awards on several occasions.

The group is led by singer-songwriter Vladimir Dotel and also includes David Diaz and Junior Pimentel.

Band History 

The trio was founded in 1993.

In 1995, Ilegales released their debut album and was certified hit.In 1996,  the single "La Morena" was a massive hit and Peaked at 6 on RPM Dance Charts in Canada. It was certified Gold in Mexico selling over 100,000 unites, Gold in Venezuela and Platinum in the United States.

In 1998, they won "Best Rap Artist" and "Best Rap Album" for Rebotando at the 1998 Latin Billboard Music Awards. En la Mira, was nominated for "Best Rap Album of The Year" at the 1999 Latin Billboard Music Awards. Also, in that year the performed Viña del Mar Festival. By the end of 1999, "Ilegales" and "Rebotando" had sold over 1.5 millions of copies worldwide. and where certified four times platinum in Chile.

in 1999, "Live" was nominated for Best Merengue Album at the 43th Grammy Awards.

in 2002, the band was nominated to Lo Nuestro Award. In addition to reaching the Billboard Tropical charts on their own, the group also had a hit with Alexandra Cabrera De La Cruz of Monchy y Alexandra. They were nominated for the Latin Grammy in 2003 for Best Pop Album.

In 2013, Ilegales received the nomination of "Tropical Songs Artist of the Year, Duo or Group" at the 2013 Billboard Music Awards.

In 2015, Ilegales was nominated as "Best Group or Band" to the Lo Nuestro Award. In that same year, they performed at the Nuryn Sanlley amphitheater to celebrate 20th Anniversary of the band. The Single "Pasarla Bien" with El Potro Alvarez, become their 8th Top 10 on Biilboard Tropical Airplay and peaked at number one on Venezuela airplay.

In 2019, Ilegales 12th studio album Tropicalia was nominated for Best Contemporary/Tropical Fusion Album at the 20th Annual Latin Grammy Awards.

Discography

Studio albums

Live albums 

 Live (1999)
 El Sonido en Vivo (2014)

Compilation Albums 

 Serie 2000 (2000)
 Ilegales: Hits (2002)
 La Historia (2003)
 10 de Coleccion (2007)

Charted Singles

Notes

External links
 

Dominican Republic musical groups
Merengue music groups
Latin pop music groups